Eric Palmer may refer to:

Eric Palmer (cricketer) (born 1931), English cricketer
Eric Palmer (philosopher), American philosopher
Eric Palmer (politician) (born 1960), American politician

See also
Erik Palmer-Brown (born 1997), American soccer player